Ultron is an android supervillain in the Marvel Comics universe.

Ultron may also refer to:

 Ultron, a fictional device in the Star Control computer game series
 Ultron, the name of the home planet of superhero Thermoman in the British comedy series My Hero
 Petron Ultron, a brand name of gasoline engine oils in the Philippines by Petron Corporation
 A model name used for various camera lenses manufactured by Cosina Voigtländer